Ziortza Isasi Cristobal (born 5 August 1995) is a Spanish professional racing cyclist, who currently rides for UCI Women's Continental Team .

References

External links

1995 births
Living people
Spanish female cyclists
Cyclists from the Basque Country (autonomous community)
Sportspeople from Biscay
People from Durangaldea
21st-century Spanish women